Taljard is a surname. Notable people with the surname include:

Dion Taljard (born 1970), South African cricketer
Jeff Taljard (born 1987), South African rugby union player
Matthew Taljard (born 1985), South African rugby union player, brother of Jeff